The 2019 All-Ireland Senior Ladies' Football Championship is the 46th edition of the Ladies' Gaelic Football Association's premier inter-county Ladies' Gaelic Football tournament. It is known for sponsorship reasons as the TG4 All-Ireland Senior Ladies' Football Championship.

It was won by Dublin, who defeated Galway in the final.

Competition format

Provincial championships

Connacht, Leinster and Ulster each organise their provincial championship. All matches are knockout.

In Munster there are three teams in the provincial championship. They play each other in a round-robin phase, with two teams progressing to the final.

All-Ireland

 Group stage
The 12 teams are drawn into four groups of three teams.

Knockout stage
The winners of each group and the runners-up compete in the four All-Ireland quarter-finals. Two semi-finals and a final follow.

Provincial championships

Connacht Championship

Connacht Final

Connacht Final Replay

Leinster Championship

Leinster Final

Munster Championship

Group stage
Games take place on 11 May, 25 May, and 1 June 2019.

Munster Final

Ulster Championship

Ulster Round 1

Ulster Semi-Finals

Ulster Final

All-Ireland Group Stage

All-Ireland Group Stage

The 12 teams are drawn into four groups of three teams, with each group containing one provincial champion, one provincial finalist, and one other team.

Three group points are awarded for a win and one for a draw. The winners and runners-up in each group compete in the four All-Ireland quarter-finals.

Group games take place 13–28 July 2019.

Group 1

Group 2

Group 3

Group 4

All-Ireland Knockout

All-Ireland Quarter-Finals

Each of the four winners from the group stage play one of the four runners-up.

All-Ireland Semi-Finals

All-Ireland final

Relegation play-offs

The last-placed team in each group contest the relegation playoffs. Note that the provincial champions are exempt from relegation.

The losers of the relegation play-offs play in the 2020 intermediate championship.

 are relegated to the All-Ireland Intermediate Ladies' Football Championship for 2020.

References